Strawberry Frog may refer to:

 Strawberry poison-dart frog, (Dendrobates pumilio), a poison dart frog found in Central America
 Strawberry Rain Frog (Breviceps acutirostris), a frog endemic to South Africa
 StrawberryFrog, an independent advertising agency; see Movement marketing